Erywan Yusof is the incumbent 2nd Minister of Foreign Affairs of Brunei and ASEAN's special envoy to Myanmar.

Education 
Yusof graduated from University College Swansea (now Swansea University) in 1991 with a Master of Science degree in Genetics and its Applications.

Political career 
He was appointed as the deputy minister of MofA in 2015, and subsequently appointed as deputy chairman of the Brunei Strategy Council in November 2015 and of the Brunei Economic Development Board in 2016.

On 4 August 2021, ASEAN foreign ministers selected Yusof as ASEAN's special envoy to Myanmar, to help mediate the country's crisis following the 2021 Myanmar coup d'état. U.N. Secretary-General Antonio Guterres welcomed Yusof’s appointment. 413 civil society organisations in Myanmar publicly criticized ASEAN's appointment of Yusof, for excluding the National Unity Government (NUG), civil society, and pro-democracy forces such as the Civil Disobedience Movement (CDM), as part of its decision-making process.

On 6 October, Yusof expressed concerns with the Burmese military's lack of progress in implementing ASEAN's five-point consensus, signaling ASEAN may not invite Myanmar's junta, the State Administration Council, to an ASEAN Summit later that month. On 14 October, Yusof abruptly cancelled a planned visit to Myanmar after the military junta denied him access to opposition stakeholders like Aung San Suu Kyi, in contravention of the five-point consensus agreed to by parties. Min Aung Hlaing was ultimately barred from attending the summit. Hun Sen signaled he may replace Yusof with Cambodia's incumbent foreign minister Prak Sokhonn, who has criticized the Burmese military regime, when Cambodia chairs ASEAN next year. Prak will succeed Yusof on 1 January 2022.

Awards and honours

Honours 
 
 Order of Setia Negara Brunei First Class (PSNB) – Dato Seri Setia

See also 

 List of current foreign ministers
 Cabinet of Brunei

References 

Living people
Alumni of Swansea University
Foreign ministers of Brunei
Year of birth missing (living people)